16 Aurigae is a triple star system located 232 light years away from the Sun in the northern constellation of Auriga. It is visible to the naked eye as a faint, orange-hued star with an apparent visual magnitude of 4.547, and is located about 2/3 of the way from Capella toward Beta Tauri. It also lies in the midst of the Melotte 31 cluster, but is merely a line-of-sight interloper. The system has a relatively high proper motion, advancing across the celestial sphere at the rate of 0.166 arc seconds per annum, and is moving closer to the Earth with a heliocentric radial velocity of −28 km/s.

The notation of the former class indicates weak lines of CN in the spectrum. This star is an estimated five billion years old with 1.30 times the mass of the Sun. As a consequence of exhausting the hydrogen at its core, it has expanded to 18.8 times the Sun's radius. The star is radiating 112 times the luminosity of the Sun from its enlarged photosphere at an effective temperature of 4,264 K.

It shows a common proper motion with the primary and thus is a likely third member of the system.

References

External links
 HR 1726
 CCDM J05182+3322
 Image 16 Aurigae
 

K-type giants
Spectroscopic binaries
Triple star systems
Auriga (constellation)
Durchmusterung objects
Aurigae, 16
034334
024727
1726